Felix Klos (born 1992) is an American–Dutch historian, political scientist and author.

Education
Klos was educated at the Lincoln College at the University of Oxford, and Middlebury College, Vermont. His academic work has focused on European integration. During his studies he served as a Legislative Intern in the United States Senate and an International Office Intern for the progressive Dutch Liberal Democratic Party D66.

Publications
Klos is the author of Churchill on Europe: The Untold Story of Churchill's European Project (London, IB Tauris, June 2016) and Winston Churchill – Father of Europe (Amsterdam, 2016, Hollands Diep). The Guardian described the book as "scintillating" and observed that it "shows very persuasively how Churchill supported a postwar union of European states and wanted Britain to play a leading part in it.". In addition to the books Klos published a number of newspaper and magazine articles regarding Churchill's European legacy in the perspective of the UK EU referendum in June 2016.

References

Living people
21st-century American historians
21st-century American male writers
Alumni of Lincoln College, Oxford
Middlebury College alumni
Historians of Europe
American male non-fiction writers
1992 births